The Prom Kings were an American rock band based in Los Angeles, California that formed in 2001. The band released their self-titled debut album on August 2, 2005. Their first single, "Alone," started getting played on American rock radio stations in January 2005. The Prom Kings were signed with the independent record label Three Kings DBC. The record label's website has been taken down as of 2011. The Prom Kings released their second single, "Black Gold," on December 26, 2006. The band consisted of Fredrik Ramberg (guitar), Renato López (guitar), Henry Strauch (drums), Mauricio Jacome (bass), and Chris Carney (vocals).

AllMusic reviewed the band's first album by saying "They're no doubt rolling in a nondescript grey Chevy Malibu, because that's about how distinctive this album is..." citing the album's generic blandness.

Lead singer Chris Carney was later featured on the show twentyfourseven, which aired on MTV from December 2006 to February 2007. Carney died of injuries sustained in a traffic accident on December 4, 2015. He was 35 years old. Renato López was found dead of gunshot wounds in Santa María Mazatla, Mexico in November 2016. He was 33 years old.

The Prom Kings track listing
All songs written by The Prom Kings and Michael Carney except where noted.

Chart performance

Album

Singles

Discography

Studio albums
The Prom Kings (2005, Three Kings DBC)

Singles
Alone (2005)
Black Gold (2006)

Music videos

Personnel
Performance and production credits are adapted from the album's liner notes.

Appearances
The song "Birthday" was featured on the ESPN SportsCenter television program on July 4, 2005. 
The song "Blow" was featured in both the movie and on the official soundtrack for The Island in 2005, a commercial for the DVD release of the film Ghost Rider in 2007, and in both the movie and on the official soundtrack for TT3D: Closer to the Edge in 2011.
The song "Down" was featured on the soundtrack of the EA Sports game Arena Football.

References

External links
 [ Entry on allmusic]
 Three Kings DBC

Rock music groups from California
American post-grunge musical groups